Kredenn Geltiek (Celtic Creed) is a neo-Pagan Druidic group founded in Brittany in 1936. It was later known as Kredenn Geltiek Hollvedel (Celtic Creed of the World). It now exists under the name Kevanvod Tud Donn (Parliament of people of Dêua Ana). It publishes the journal Ialon-Kad-Nemeton.

History
Founded in 1936 by Rafig Tullou, Morvan Marchal, and Francis Bayer du Kern, Kredenn Geltiek Hollvedel grew out of the Breton Federalist Movement as an attempt to reassert ancient Celtic religious beliefs. The group's explicitly anti-Catholic and Modern Druidic ideology distinguished it from the existing non-religious Gorsedd of Brittany, from which it emerged as a splinter group.

Morvan Marchal was the group's first "Arch-Druid." They mixed readings of the Bhagavad Gita and the maxims of Lao Tsu with Celtic traditions to create an Indo-European esotericism as a basis for the re-creation of druidic worship. Esotericist research by Gwilherm Berthou led to claims that ancient Celtic beliefs had been reconstructed.

During World War II, its journal, Kad (combat), devoted to druidic philosophy, changed its title to the less militaristic Nemeton ("Sanctuary"). This later became Ialon-Kad-Nemeton. 

From 1937 onward, the group experienced numerous schisms. The most recent was in 1994, when a faction split and moved to Commana.

See also
Breton nationalism
Seiz Breur

External links
Official Website

Breton nationalism
Inter-Celtic organisations
Neo-druidism
Modern pagan organizations based in France
Religious organizations established in 1936
Modern pagan organizations established in the 1930s